Tukilti-Ninurta Epic is an Assyrian epic written in Akkadian describing and glorifying the wars and conquests of the Assyrian king Tukulti-Ninurta I against the Babylonian king Kashtiliash IV during the Kassite dynasty. Though in principle successful (the Assyrians kidnapped the statue of Babylon's city's god, Marduk), due to Babylonian rebellions and the interference of Elam, Assur had to return the city to the Kassites. It can therefore be considered as a form of propaganda. Scholars such as Joseph P. Farrel, suggest this epic likely is an inventory of war "booty" upon victory of this conflict in actual human history.

References

Further reading
 Peter Machinist, "Literature as Politics: the Tukulti-Ninurta Epic and the Bible", Catholic Biblical Quarterly, 38 (1976), pp. 455-482
 Barbara Patzek, "Homer and the Near East: The case of Assyrian historical epic and prose narrative", Gaia: revue interdisciplinaire sur la Grèce Archaïque, 7 (2003). pp. 63–74. 

Akkadian literature
Assyrian culture